Live At Deeply Vale is a live album recorded in 1978 by Nik Turner's Sphynx at the Deeply Vale Festival.

Track listing

Personnel
Nik Turner - sax, flute, vocals
Karina Barrat - keyboards, vocals
Hari Williamson - guitar, sarcofagus
Baggins - bass
Ermanno Ghizio Erba (aka Dino Ferrari) - drums
Steffi Sharpstrings - guitar

1978 live albums
Nik Turner albums